CAAS or CaaS is an acronym for the following:
Civil Aviation Authority of Singapore
Chinese Academy of Agricultural Sciences
Coalition for Access, Affordability, and Success, former name of the Coalition for College
Content as a service